Charles-René-Léonidas d'Irumberry de Salaberry (27 August 1820 – 25 March 1882) was a French-Canadian militia officer, founding commanding officer of Les Voltigeurs de Québec, and civil servant noted for his role in negotiating on the behalf of the Government of Canada during the Red River Rebellion of 1869–1870. His father, Charles-Michel d'Irumberry de Salaberry was a hero of the Battle of Chateauguay during the War of 1812.

He was the brother of Melchior-Alphonse d'Irumberry de Salaberry.

External links 
 

1820 births
1882 deaths
People of the Red River Rebellion
Pre-Confederation Quebec people
French Quebecers
Canadian people of Basque descent

Les Voltigeurs de Québec
Les Voltigeurs de Québec officers